Lamiasaurus is an extinct genus of therapsids from the Tapinocephalus Assemblage Zone of the Karoo.  It is known from an indeterminate jaw fragment that may be either titanosuchid or anteosaurid.

References

Tapinocephalians
Prehistoric therapsid genera
Prehistoric synapsids of Africa
Fossil taxa described in 1914
Taxa named by D. M. S. Watson